is a Japanese former professional football currently assistant coach of Japan national team.

Club career
Nanami was born in Fujieda on November 28, 1972. After graduating from Juntendo University, he joined Júbilo Iwata in 1995. From first season, he played as regular player and became a most central player in golden era in club history. The club won the champions 1997 J1 League and 1998 J.League Cup. He was also selected Best Eleven for three years in a row (1996-1998). In Asia, the club won 1998–99 Asian Club Championship.

In July 1999, Nanami moved to Serie A club Venezia on loan. However the club was relegated to Serie B in 2000. In September 2000, he returned to Júbilo Iwata. He hurts his knees in 2001 and he reduced opportunities to play in the match after that. The club won the champions at 2002 J1 League and 2003 Emperor's Cup. In 2006, his opportunity to play decreased and he moved to Cerezo Osaka in August 2006. In 2007, he moved to J2 League club Tokyo Verdy. In 2008, he returned to Júbilo Iwata and announced his retirement in November 2008 after being dogged by a knee injury.

International career
Nanami was a key figure for the Japan national team throughout the late 1990s and during the early part of this century.

On August 6, 1995, Nanami debuted and scored a goal for Japan against Costa Rica. From 1996, he became a central player and wore the number 10 shirt. In 1996, he played all matches for Japan included 1996 Asian Cup. At 1998 World Cup qualification in 1997, Japan won the qualify for 1998 World Cup first time Japan's history. In 1998, he played all matches included World Cup. He also played at 1999 Copa América and 2000 Asian Cup. At 2000 Asian Cup, he played full time in all matches and scored 3 goals. Japan won the champions and he was selected MVP Awards. After he hurts his knees in 2001, he did not play for Japan. He played 67 games and scored 9 goals for Japan until 2001.

Coaching career
In September 2014, Nanami became a manager for Júbilo Iwata as Péricles Chamusca successor. Júbilo played in J2 League in 2014 season and aimed to return to J1 League. However Júbilo finished at 4th place in 2014 and missed promotion to J1. In 2015, Júbilo won the 2nd place and promoted to J1 League. Although Júbilo finished 13th place in 2016, Júbilo gained Shunsuke Nakamura and rose at 6th place in 2017. However the club results were bad from 2018. Although Júbilo finished at 16th place of 18 clubs in 2018 and remained J1, he resigned in June 2019 when Júbilo was at the bottom place.On 21 June 2021, he appointed manager of J2 club, Matsumoto Yamaga. 5 months later, coach performance he was poor and his club got relegated to 2022 J3 League for first time in history. In 2022, he left the club after contract expired.

Career statistics

Club

International

Scores and results list Japan's goal tally first, score column indicates score after each Nanami goal.

Managerial statistics
.

Honours
Júbilo Iwata
Asian Club Championship: 1999
J1 League: 1997, 1999, 2002
Emperor's Cup: 2003
J.League Cup: 1998
Japanese Super Cup: 2003, 2004

Japan
AFC Asian Cup: 2000

Individual
AFC Asian Cup Most Valuable Player: 2000
AFC Asian Cup Best Eleven: 1996,  2000
J.League Best Eleven: 1996, 1997, 1998, 2002
J.League 20th Anniversary Team
J.League Cup New Hero Award: 1996
Selected to AFC All Star Team: 1998, 2000

References

External links
 
 
 Japan National Football Team Database
 
 

1972 births
Living people
People from Fujieda, Shizuoka
Juntendo University alumni
Association football people from Shizuoka Prefecture
Japanese footballers
Association football midfielders
Japan international footballers
J1 League players
J2 League players
Júbilo Iwata players
Cerezo Osaka players
Tokyo Verdy players
Venezia F.C. players
Serie A players
1996 AFC Asian Cup players
1998 FIFA World Cup players
1999 Copa América players
2000 AFC Asian Cup players
AFC Asian Cup-winning players
Japanese football managers
J1 League managers
J2 League managers
J3 League managers
Júbilo Iwata managers
Matsumoto Yamaga FC managers
Japanese expatriate footballers
Japanese expatriate sportspeople in Italy
Expatriate footballers in Italy